Deir Kifa   is a local authority in Southern Lebanon, located in Tyre District, Governorate of South Lebanon.

Name
E. H. Palmer wrote in 1881 that it meant The convent of Kifa. p.n.
Kifa is a Syriac Aramaic word that means rock in Arabic and Peter in Greek. It is the title of Saint Simon, son of Jonah, a disciple of Jesus Christ.

Location
Deir Kifa is located in the South Governorate, Tyre District. It is 390 m above sea level and 107 kilometers to the southwest of Beirut, the capital city of Lebanon, or about two hours, and 16 km from the center of its district Tyre. Its population is about five thousand people; about a thousand live in the village, while the rest are distributed in expatriate countries such as Brazil, the United States, Germany, and some Persian Gulf countries. A large number of her sons settled in the capital, Beirut, in order to search for ways of life and work that are missing in the village.

History
In 1875 Victor Guérin noted: "Cisterns hollowed in the rock, and cut stones of ancient appearance, show that this village has succeeded a more ancient one." He further noted that the village contained  150 Metualis, and was situated on a high hill.

In 1881, the PEF's Survey of Western Palestine (SWP) described it as: "A village built of stone, containing about 150 Metawileh and fifty Christians, situated on a hill, and surrounded by fig- trees, olives, and arable land; water supply from two springs and cisterns."

Castle
In 1875 Guérin noted: "... I climb the slopes cultivated by terraces of a high isolated hill, crowned by the ruins of a castle, called Kala't Maroun. It had been built with regular stones, but of small size. Founded, it is said, by Dhaher el-A'mer, it had succeeded an ancient locality whose name has remained unknown, unless it is necessary to look for it, more or less altered, in that of Maroun. In any case, there is still considerable debris of surrounding walls, semi-circular towers, various buildings, and several large cisterns. A dozen Métualis currently live in the middle of these ruins, which scrub encroaches on from all sides, and they cultivate the plantations of fig and pomegranate trees that cover the flanks and part of the top of the hill."

In 1881, the SWP described  the castle to the north of Deir Kifa (which they called Kulat Marun) as: "A ruined Saracenic castle, built by Dhahr el 'Amr, of rectangular form, with round-towers at each angle, and at intervals along the north and south walls. A considerable portion of the walls are still standing ; the masonry is all small, with pointed arches. There are no signs of the castle having been built on earlier foundations. They furter noted that it contained "about fifty Metawileh. The country is arable, and there are cisterns and a spring near. The Arab houses are built with materials from the castle."

Maroun Castle is historically named after the castle of Maroun, the French Crusader leader who renovated its construction. The castle has seven huge circular towers, some parts of which have collapsed due to time. Deir Kifa Castle was built on a mountainous hill by Aram ibn Yaqoub, adjacent to the agricultural plains. Yaron and Tibnin, and a commercial and military relationship arose between them. Deir Kifa Castle consists of three layers and extends over an area of twenty thousand square meters. It has four springs, and 12 towers, some of which are circular, Aramaic-Canaanite, and some are square-cruciform. Inside are gymnasiums and others for meetings. It contains the king’s palace to the west and vaults that take a square shape. And Christ stayed there. The town of Deir Kifa was considered one of the ten villages that Hiram II, King of Tyre, gave him. The area of the castle is 17,000 square meters and consists of three floors. It contains many cellars, destroyed inns, rooms, multiple stone houses, horse stables, prisons, playgrounds, courtyards, and wheat stores. 365 wells are spread to collect water and 4 springs that dried up years ago. Its wall is 6 to 12 meters high and two meters wide. It has seven corners on each of them, a semi-circular watchtower with a diameter of 8 meters, used for guarding, hunting and defense. It rises 400 m above sea level. It overlooks many towns: from the east, Jebel Maroun and Burj Qalawiya, from the south, Deir Kifa, from the north Srifa and Al-Nafakhiya, and the west, the valleys to the sea.

Education

References

Bibliography

External links
Survey of Western Palestine, Map 2:  IAA, Wikimedia commons

 Populated places in Tyre District
Shia Muslim communities in Lebanon